Marius Nicoară is a former president of the Cluj County Council, and president of the Cluj National Liberal Party (PNL). As President of the County Council, he was both the head of the local Legislature (the County Council) and the local Executive (as the administrative law gives executive powers to the presidents of the counties' legislatures).

On 10 May 2010, he was filmed while watching an erotic film on his laptop during a session in Parliament. He commented: "This was not an adult movie, it was simply an email I received from a colleague [...]. That had nothing to do with adult movies. [...] It's just a movie about Thai vs American massage".

References
  Declaration of interests

External links
  Page of the President of the Cluj County Council

Members of the Senate of Romania
Councillors in Romania
National Liberal Party (Romania) politicians
Living people
1958 births
Politicians from Cluj-Napoca